Leslie Feist (born 13 February 1976), known mononymously as Feist, is a Canadian indie pop singer-songwriter and guitarist, performing both as a solo artist and as a member of the indie rock group Broken Social Scene.

Feist launched her solo music career in 1999 with the release of Monarch.  Her subsequent studio albums, Let It Die, released in 2004, and The Reminder, released in 2007, were critically acclaimed and commercially successful, selling over 2.5 million copies. The Reminder earned Feist four Grammy nominations, including a nomination for Best New Artist. She has received 11 Juno Awards, including two Artist of the Year. Her fourth studio album, Metals, was released in 2011. In 2012, Feist collaborated on a split EP with metal group Mastodon, releasing an interactive music video in the process.

Feist received three Juno awards at the 2012 ceremony: Artist of the Year, Adult Alternative Album of the Year for Metals, and Music DVD of the Year for her documentary Look at What the Light Did Now.

Early life
Leslie Feist was born on 13 February 1976 in Amherst, Nova Scotia, Canada. Her parents are both artists. Her father, Harold Feist, was an American-Canadian abstract expressionist painter who taught fine arts at Mount Allison University in Sackville, New Brunswick. Her mother, Lyn Feist, was a student of ceramics from Saskatchewan. After their first child, Ben, was born, the family moved to Sackville. Feist is also the niece of guitarist Dan Achen, who played in the 1990s rock band Junkhouse and had also produced for numerous artists (Achen died in 2010 due to a heart attack).

Feist's parents divorced soon after she was born and Ben, Feist and their mother moved to Regina, Saskatchewan, where they lived with her grandparents. They later moved to Calgary, Alberta, where she attended Bishop Carroll High School as well as Alternative High School. She aspired to be a writer, and spent much of her youth singing in choirs. At the age of 12, Feist performed as one of 1,000 dancers in the opening ceremonies of the Calgary Winter Olympics, which she cites as inspiration for the video "1234."

Because her father is American, Feist has dual Canadian-U.S. citizenship, joking later that she was given U.S. citizenship as part of a deal with Apple.

Music career
In 1991, at age 15, Feist got her start in music when she founded and was the lead vocalist for a Calgary punk band called Placebo (not to be confused with the English band Placebo). She and her bandmates won a local Battle of the Bands competition and were awarded the opening slot at the festival Infest 1993, featuring the Ramones. At this concert she met Brendan Canning, whose band hHead performed immediately before hers, and with whom she joined in Broken Social Scene ten years later.

In 1995, Feist was forced to take time off from music to recover from vocal cord damage. She moved from Calgary to Toronto in 1996. That year she was asked by Noah Mintz of hHead to play bass in his solo project Noah's Arkweld. She played the bass guitar in Noah's Arkweld for a year despite never having played bass before. In 1998, she became the rhythm guitarist for the band By Divine Right and toured with them throughout 1998, 1999, and 2000. She also played guitar for some live performances by Bodega, but was never an official member of the band.

In 1999, Feist moved into a Queen West apartment above Come As You Are with a friend of a friend, Merrill Nisker, who then began to perform as electro-punk musician Peaches. Feist worked the back of the stage at Peaches' shows, using a sock puppet and calling herself "Bitch Lap Lap". The two also toured together in England from 2000–2001, staying with Justine Frischmann of Elastica and MIA. Feist appeared as a guest vocalist on The Teaches of Peaches. Feist appears in Peaches' video for the song "Lovertits", suggestively rubbing and licking a bike. Later, Feist covered this song with Gonzales (whom she met while touring with Peaches) on her album Open Season. In 2006, Feist contributed backup vocals on a track entitled "Give 'Er", which appeared on Peaches' album Impeach My Bush.

Monarch (Lay Your Jewelled Head Down) (1999–2001)
Feist's solo debut album, Monarch, was released in 1999. It is composed of ten songs, including "Monarch" and "That's What I Say, It's Not What I Mean." The album was produced by Dan Kurtz, who would later form Dragonette.

Let It Die (2001–2006)
In the summer of 2001, Feist self-produced seven songs at home which she called The Red Demos, which have never been released commercially. She spent more than two years touring throughout Europe with Gonzales. In that same year she joined a group of old friends in forming a new version of Toronto indie rock group Broken Social Scene, adding vocals to many tracks after being forbidden to play guitar by de facto bandleader Kevin Drew. She subsequently recorded You Forgot It in People with the band. While on tour in Europe with Gonzales, they began recording new versions of her home recorded Red Demos, which would later become her major label debut Let It Die. Let It Die featured both original compositions and covers, and Feist has been noted both as a songwriter and as an innovative interpreter of other artists' songs.

After the recording of Let It Die, Feist moved to Paris. While in Europe, she collaborated with Norwegian duo Kings of Convenience as co-writer and guest vocalist on their album Riot on an Empty Street, singing on "Know How" and "The Build Up." She also co-wrote and sang "The Simple Story" as a duet with Jane Birkin on her album Rendezvous.

Feist toured during 2004, 2005 and 2006 through North America, Europe, Asia, and Australia supporting Let It Die. She won two Canadian Juno Awards for "Best New Artist" and "Best Alternative Rock Album" in 2004. Sales of Let It Die totaled 500, 000 internationally, and she was awarded a platinum record in Canada, as well as a gold album in France. Fellow Canadian Buck 65 appeared in the Feist-directed music video for "One Evening," which was also nominated for Video of the Year at the 2004 Juno Awards.

In 2005, Feist contributed to the UNICEF benefit song "Do They Know It's Hallowe'en?" The track “Mushaboom" was used in an advert for a Lacoste men's fragrance, as well as in the film 500 Days of Summer.

An album of remixes and collaborations, Open Season, was released on 18 April 2006.

Feist also lent her voice to the two tracks "La Même Histoire" and "We're All in the Dance" for the soundtrack to the 2006 film Paris, je t'aime.

The Reminder (2006–2007)

In early 2006, Feist moved to Paris, where she recorded a followup to Let It Die at LaFrette Studios with Gonzales, Mocky, Jamie Lidell, and Renaud Letang, as well as her touring band Bryden Baird, Jesse Baird, Julian Brown of Apostle of Hustle, and Afie Jurvanen of Paso Mino.

Feist's third solo album, The Reminder, was released on 23 April 2007 in Europe, and on 1 May 2007 in Canada, the USA, and the rest of the world. She toured worldwide to promote the album. The album features "1234," a song co-written by New Buffalo's Sally Seltmann, that became a surprise hit after being featured in a commercial for the iPod nano, hitting No. 8 in the US, a rare feat for indie rock musicians and even more notable since it hit the Top Ten on the strength of downloads alone. She has been lauded in the press and was featured on the cover of the New York Times arts section in June 2007. The Reminder had sold worldwide over 1,000,000 copies and is certified gold in the U.S. The album also won a 2008 Juno Award for "Album of the Year" on 6 April 2008 in Calgary, Alberta.

Videos for many of the singles were directed by Patrick Daughters, who previously directed the video for "Mushaboom" and went on to direct "1234," "My Moon, My Man," and "I Feel It All." "1234" and "My Moon, My Man" were choreographed by the acclaimed choreographer & dancer Noemie Lafrance. The video for Honey, Honey features the work of avant-garde puppet troupe, The Old Trout Puppet Workshop.

"I Feel It All" was featured in the UK teen comedy The Inbetweeners and was used in the film The Accidental Husband. "Honey Honey" was featured in The L Word (episode 5.06, "Lights! Camera! Action!"). "I Feel It All" was featured in the 2008 film The Women. Popular German DJ Boys Noize remixed "My Moon, My Man," which appears on his 2007 debut album Oi Oi Oi. The DJ has also been known to close sets with the remix. In January 2009, Bon Iver played a cover of Feist's "The Park" from The Reminder on Australian radio's Triple J. The song "Limit to Your Love" was featured in season 2, episode 1 of British teen drama Skins, and was used in the film The Accidental Husband. A cover version of the song was released by UK singer-producer James Blake as a single from his 2011 self-titled album.

Prior to the airing of an Apple iPod nano commercial featuring this song, The Reminder was selling at approximately 6,000 copies per week, and "1234" at 2,000 downloads per week. Following the commercial, the song passed 73,000 total downloads and reached No. 7 on Hot Digital Songs and No. 8 on the Billboard Hot 100; The Reminder jumped from No. 36 to No. 28 on the Billboard 200, with sales of 19,000. Following the television advertisement for the iPod nano in the UK, the single beat its original chart position of 102 to become number 8 in the UK charts. Time magazine named "1234" one of The 10 Best Songs of 2007, ranking it at No. 2. Writer Josh Tyrangiel called the song a "masterpiece," praising Feist for singing it "with a mixture of wisdom and exuberance that's all her own". On 6 April 2008, Feist won a Juno Award for the single as "Single of the Year".

Feist performed an alternate version of "1234" on Sesame Street during its 39th season (2008), teaching children to count to the number four. She said working with the Muppets was a career highlight.

In 2009, Feist appeared in a short film directed by Broken Social Scene bandmate Kevin Drew that focused on her song "The Water." Feist appears alongside Cillian Murphy and David Fox in the silent role of "Mother." This film was streamed from Pitchfork.com for a week starting on 2 March 2009. In an interview with the site, Feist described the experience of being in this movie as "watching a movie while being in a movie."

Metals (2007–2013)
In 2007, Feist was placed No. 9 on Spinner.com's 2007 Women Who Rock Right Now. and named both Spin's and Blender's Breakout Artist of the Year. After taking Bob Wiseman on the road as her opening act in Europe she acted in his video Who Am I and joined him on drums for You Don't Love Me.

Feist was photographed by Annie Leibovitz for the November 2007 issue of Vanity Fair as part of a photo essay on folk music. On 3 November that year, she performed "1234" and "I Feel It All" on Saturday Night Live.

Feist was on the cover of the Spring 2008 edition of Naked Eye. On 28 April, Feist was interviewed by Stephen Colbert. At the end of the show she performed "I Feel It All," while Colbert donned Feist's blue, sequined, strapless jumpsuit from the "1234" video. Feist joined Colbert again on his first-ever Christmas special, A Colbert Christmas: The Greatest Gift of All!, which first aired on 23 November 2008. She played an angel working for Heaven's overloaded phone (prayer) service. She also accompanied the Disko Bay Expedition of Cape Farewell. On 20 October 2008, she told The Canadian Press that, following the success of her last album, The Reminder, she felt she needed to step away from the pressures of the music industry to consider her next career move and "rest for a minute".

In March 2009, it was announced that she would make a guest appearance on the track "You and I" on Wilco's seventh album.

In 2009, Feist was featured in the CTV television film "My Musical Brain" with neuroscientist and writer Daniel Levitin, based on Levitin's bestselling book This Is Your Brain on Music.

Feist collaborated with Brooklyn band Grizzly Bear on the song "Service Bell" for the AIDS charity the Red Hot Organization. This song appears on Red Hot's album Dark Was the Night, and she joined the band in June 2009 during their Toronto show to sing this song and contribute backing vocals to the song "Two Weeks." She also collaborated with Ben Gibbard on a cover of Vashti Bunyan's "Train Song" for the same Dark Was the Night album.

In June 2009, she re-joined Broken Social Scene at a North by Northeast performance celebrating the launch of the band's biography entitled This Book Is Broken, in which she is prominently featured. This contradicted various rumors saying that it was unlikely Feist would ever play with the band again; this was the first of several appearances with BSS. She performed with Broken Social Scene during their concert of 11 July 2009 at Toronto's Harbourfront Centre, singing and playing guitar through most of the concert, as well as performing a medley of her solo songs with Kevin Drew and his solo songs. The concert was filmed by director Bruce Macdonald and released as This Movie Is Broken.  She sings on Broken Social Scene's fourth studio album Forgiveness Rock Record. She performed with the band again in June 2010 on Olympic Island, and at the Sound Academy in Toronto on 9 and 10 December 2010.

Feist joined Beck, Wilco, Jamie Lidell and James Gadson in a Los Angeles studio covering Skip Spence's Oar as part of Beck's Record Club series, with videos appearing on Beck's website beginning November 2009.

She also contributed vocals on Constant Companion the second album from Canadian songwriter Doug Paisley. Feist sings on the tracks "What I Saw" and the duet "Don't Make Me Wait". The album was released 12 October 2010.

Her song "Limit to Your Love" was covered by British post-dubstep artist James Blake and later remixed as a dubstep track by Benny Benassi and played to high acclaim at the 2011 Ultra Music Festival.

On 7 July 2011, Feist with Radiohead's Colin Greenwood, Air's Nicolas Godin, The Hotrats and Soap&Skin performed The Velvet Underground and Nico's "Femme Fatale" at an all-star gig "The Velvet Underground Revisited" which took place in Cité de la Musique, Paris.

Her album Metals was released on 30 September 2011. Collaborators include Valgeir Sigurðsson, Chilly Gonzales, and Mocky. The album received widespread acclaim from music critics  and appeared on the !earshot Campus and Community National Top 50 Albums chart in January 2012. Feist recorded Metals in a custom-built studio on a cliff in Big Sur, California.

In 2012, Feist covered a song by the progressive metal band Mastodon, and they in turn covered one of hers, with both songs released on a split 7-inch on Record Store Day. They also released a crossfading interactive video for the track "A Commotion".

Feist also has a cameo in the 2011 movie The Muppets.

In 2012, she wrote the song "Fire in the Water" exclusively for the film The Twilight Saga: Breaking Dawn – Part 2. The song was played when Edward and Bella are intimate in their cottage, and has been well received by critics.

Her song "The Water" was covered on American jazz violinist Zach Brock's 2012 album Almost Never Was.

In January 2013, it was announced Feist would headline, along with labelmate Broken Social Scene, the Arts & Crafts Field Trip Music Festival to commemorate the tenth anniversary of Arts & Crafts.

Look at What the Light Did Now and Pleasure (2013–2021)
In September 2010, Feist announced through her website the release of a documentary film about the creative process of making of The Reminder, called Look at What the Light Did Now. It was directed by Canadian film director Anthony Seck and was shot on Super 8 mm film. The film was released on DVD in December 2010, and a limited series of screenings were conducted including a Toronto screening at the Royal Ontario Museum, which featured a post-film interview of Feist by George Stroumboulopoulos.

The film focuses on the recording of The Reminder as well as the development of the tour through puppetry and projection. The film includes interviews with band member Afie Jurvanen; producer Chilly Gonzales; Broken Social Scene bandmates Kevin Drew and Andrew Whiteman; and video director Patrick Daughters.

Bonus materials on the DVD include "This One Jam", an early performance of Feist with Gonzales at Trash Club; live performances from the Reminder tour; and two short films: "The Water" starring Feist and "Departures" starring Kevin Drew and based on an idea by Feist. A CD is also included that contains the documentary soundtrack (tracks from The Reminder re-interpreted and performed by Gonzales), live performances by Feist, as well as two versions of the title track, "Look at What the Light Did Now", one of which was recorded as a duet with the song's writer, American musician Kyle Field.

In April 2017, Feist released Pleasure, preceding it with the release of the title track "Pleasure" as a single in March 2017. On 27 April 2017, she introduced the album (a day ahead of its release) at Trinity St. Paul, Toronto. She performed the entire content of the album (in reverse order) as well as some of her earlier work including, "I Feel It All".

At the Juno Awards of 2021, Feist performed with the surviving members of The Tragically Hip on their 2002 single "It's a Good Life If You Don't Weaken", which marked the band's first televised performance since Gord Downie's death. In a promotional interview on CBC Radio's Q before the ceremony, the band stated that they agreed to perform specifically because Feist had been proposed as the vocalist, with Langlois stating that "OK, so that's not going to be some guy trying to sing like Gord or some guy trying not to sing like Gord. It was a 'no' until Feist came up."

Multitudes (2021–present) 
In June 2021, Feist announced that her live Multitudes residency would begin in Europe in summer 2021. It included performances in Hamburg, Ottawa and Toronto, and featured new songs without the release of a new album. Initially intended to accompany the release of Pleasure, the style of Multitudes as a traditional, intimate and communal experience for smaller audiences was a concept that Feist and designer Rob Sinclair co-designed.

On 1 September 2022, Feist announced that she would withdraw from opening for Arcade Fire on their tour after their frontman Win Butler was accused of sexual misconduct.

On 14 February 2023, Feist released three new songs, "Hiding Out In The Open", "In Lightning" and "Love Who We Are Meant To", from her sixth studio album, Multitudes, announcing its scheduled release on 14 April 2023. In the same year, she appeared on Hayden's album Are We Good, as a duet vocalist on the single "On a Beach".
Feist also announced a North American spring tour in 2023 to promote Multitudes.

Personal life 

Feist has one adopted daughter, who was born at the end of 2019.

Discography

Monarch (Lay Your Jewelled Head Down) (1999)
Let It Die (2004)

The Reminder (2007)
Metals (2011)
Pleasure (2017)
Multitudes (2023)

Filmography

Awards

See also

Music of Canada
Canadian rock
List of Canadian musicians
List of bands from Canada
Mononymous persons

References

External links

 
 Feist's Arts & Crafts artist page 
 
 Feist's road to success
 Feist on Huffington Post – Metals interview

1976 births
Living people
Musicians from Calgary
Musicians from Nova Scotia
Alternative rock singers
Canadian women guitarists
Canadian singer-songwriters
Canadian people of American descent
Canadian women rock singers
Juno Award for Alternative Album of the Year winners
Juno Award for Artist of the Year winners
Musicians from Sackville, New Brunswick
Canadian indie rock musicians
Arts & Crafts Productions artists
Canadian indie pop musicians
Broken Social Scene members
Polaris Music Prize winners
People from Amherst, Nova Scotia
People from Cumberland County, Nova Scotia
Canadian women pop singers
Feminist musicians
20th-century Canadian guitarists
21st-century Canadian guitarists
Juno Award for Single of the Year winners
Juno Award for Album of the Year winners
Juno Award for Adult Alternative Album of the Year winners
Juno Award for Songwriter of the Year winners
Juno Award for Breakthrough Artist of the Year winners
20th-century Canadian drummers
21st-century Canadian drummers
20th-century Canadian pianists
21st-century Canadian pianists
Canadian banjoists
20th-century Canadian women singers
21st-century Canadian women singers
Winners of the Shortlist Music Prize
Juno Award for Pop Album of the Year winners
By Divine Right members
Canadian women singer-songwriters
20th-century women guitarists
21st-century women guitarists
20th-century women pianists
21st-century women pianists